Therriault is a surname. Notable people with the surname include:

Daniel Therriault (born 1953), American playwright, screenwriter and actor
Devin Therriault (born 1988/89), American musician
Gene Therriault (born 1960), American politician
Michael Therriault, Canadian actor